Usk Bridge may be used as the name for any bridge crossing the River Usk in Wales, UK.

Specific notable examples include:

 Usk Bridge (Brecon), the main bridge in Brecon, Powys
 Usk Bridge (Usk), the main road bridge in Usk, Monmouthshire
 Great Western Railway Usk bridge, the main railway bridge in Newport city centre
 M4 motorway Usk bridge, the motorway crossing near the city of Newport

See also
 List of bridges in Wales